Henryk  is a village in the administrative district of Gmina Brody, within Starachowice County, Świętokrzyskie Voivodeship, in south-central Poland.

The village has a population of 120.

References

Villages in Starachowice County